"Hit the Ground" is a 2015 song by Hinder.

Hit the Ground may also refer to:
"Hit the Ground", a 1988 single by The Darling Buds
"Hit the Ground", a 2000 single by 6Gig
"Hit the Ground", a single by October Sky from Hell Isn't My Home, 2007
"Hit the Ground", a 1996 single by Slowburn
"Hit the Ground", a song by Zebrahead from Phoenix, 2008
"Hit the Ground", a song by Skindred from Volume, 2015
"Hit the Ground", a song by Lizz Wright from Dreaming Wide Awake, 2005
"Hit the Ground", a song by Loadstar
"Hit the Ground", a song by Justin Bieber from Purpose, 2015